The Face Thailand Season 3 began audition on 14 August 2016 at shopping mall Siam Paragon in Bangkok. 3 September 2016 Lukkade Metinee  and Bee Namthip was reprised their roles as coaches again and Marsha Vadhanapanich was the new coach in this season, but quit in episode 8 and was replaced by Cris Horwang.  was still a host in season 3. 13 September 2016 had announced the launch and presented fifty contestants from the audition. The season premiered on

Contestants
(ages stated are at start of filming)

Episodes

Episode 1 : Casting 
First aired 4 February 2017

In the first week is to qualify for all 50 people to shoot and the next natural makeup to steer his team to three Mentor, it was decided by a shoot. Contestants from 50 finalists who had to walk around 35 people. In the second round as a model for screening into three teams, Mentor was the decision by walking and the third round to make up for Mentor selected by a team of around 23 people coming through and finalists 15 people.
Team Bee : Tia, Khaw, Blossom, Sky, Tubtim.
Team Lukkade : Hana, Mint, Metploy, Plengkhwan, Fah.
Team Marsha : Boongkie, Maya, Julie, Grace, Prim.
 Featured photographer: Surachai Saengsuwan
 Special guest:

Episode 2 : Opposite Attraction 
First aired 11 February 2017

 Winning coach and team:  Bee Namthip
 Bottom two: Plengkwan Tongsen & Boongkie Rakkhapan
 Eliminated: Boongkie Rakkhapan
 Special guest: Tae Piyarat
 Special mentor: Janie Tienphosuwan

Episode 3 : Red Carpet Catwalk With Toyota Camry  
First aired 18 February 2017

 Winning coach and team:  Bee Namthip
 Bottom two: Hana Chancheaw & Maya Goldman
 Eliminated: Hana Chancheaw

Episode 4 : Photo Shoot Crème Body Wash  
First aired 25 February 2017

 Winning coach and team:  Marsha Vadhanapanich
 Bottom two: Blossom Roongpetchrat & Metploy Jenjobjing
 Eliminated: Metploy Jenjobjing
 Special guest: Davika Hoorne

Episode 5 : Smoke Bomb Fashion Video 
First aired 4 March 2017

 Winning coach and team:  Lukkade Metinee
 Bottom two: Tubtim Labudomsakul & Maya Goldman
 Eliminated: Maya Goldman

Episode 6 : Rainy Catwalk 
First aired 11 March 2017

 Winning coach and team:  Lukkade Metinee
 Bottom two: Tia Taveepanichpan  & Prim Lodsantia
 Eliminated: Prim Lodsantia
 Special guest: Sonia Couling,  & Kanticha Chumma

Episode 7 :  Make New York Angels Happen  
First aired 18 March 2017

 Winning coach and team:   Marsha Vadhanapanich
 Bottom two: Tubtim Labudomsakul & Mint Samainiyom
 Eliminated: Mint Samainiyom
 Special guest: Janie Tienphosuwan & Ranee Campen

Episode 8 : SnailWhite Winter Runway  
First aired 25 March 2017

 Winning coach and team:  Lukkade Metinee
 Bottom two: Kaw Kaewmanee & Julie Anderson
 Eliminated: Kaw Kaewmanee
In this episode, Marsha Vadhanapanich quit and was replaced by Cris Horwang.

Episode 9 : Morning after 
First aired 1 April 2017

 Returned in new team: Hana Chancheaw
 Returned in original team: Mint Samainiyom
 Winning coach and team:  Cris Horwang
 Bottom two: Blossom Roongpetchrat & Fah Sawangkla
 Eliminated: Blossom Roongpetchrat
 Special guest: Pachara Chirathivat & Luis Meza

Episode 10 : Zorb Ball Catwalk 
First aired 8 April 2017

 Winning coach and team:  Bee Namthip
 Bottom two: Mint Samainiyom & Hana Chancheaw
 Eliminated: Hana Chancheaw
 Special guest: Urassaya Sperbund & Polpat Asavaprapha

Episode 11 : Heaven Helps You
First aired 15 April 2017

 Winning coach and team:  Lukkade Metinee
 Bottom two: Tubtim Labudomsakul &  Julie Anderson
 Eliminated: Julie Anderson
 Special guest: Luis Meza

Episode 12 : Make New York MV Happen  
First aired 22 April 2017

 Winning coach and team:  Lukkade Metinee
 Winning campaign:   Plengkhwan Tongsen 
 Final three was chosen by Coach: Grace Boonchompaisarn, Fah Sawangkla  &  Sky Hoerschler
 Fourth final was chosen by coach from winning campaign team: Plengkhwan Tongsen 
 Eliminated:  Mint Samainiyom,  Tia Taveepanichpan &   Tubtim Labudomsakul
 Special guest: Urassaya Sperbund

Episode 13 : Final Walk 
First aired 29 April 2017

 Final four: Fah Sawangkla , Plengkhwan Tongsen ,  Sky Hoerschler & Grace Boonchompaisarn
 Partner: Kanticha Chumma, Virahya Pattarachokchai & Jutiporn Arunchot
 Winning campaign: Fah Sawangkla 
 Eliminated: None
 The Face Thailand: Grace Boonchompaisarn
 Winning coach and team: Cris Horwang  
 Special guest: Marsha Vadhanapanich, Rhatha Phongam,  & Kanticha Chumma
 Honorary guest: Princess Ubolratana Rajakanya Sirivadhana Barnavadi

Summaries

Elimination Table

 The contestant was part of the winning team for the episode.
 The contestant was at risk of elimination.
 The contestant was eliminated from the competition.
 The contestant was originally eliminated but was returned to the competition on their original team.
 The contestant was originally eliminated but was returned to the competition and switched to a new team.
 The contestant won the campaign individually.
 The contestant was a Runner-Up.
 The contestant won The Face.

 Episode 1 was the casting episode. The final fifteen were divided into individual teams of five as they were selected.
 In episode 6, Sonia Couling replaced Lukkade for elimination.
 In episode 8, Marsha quit as a mentor. She was replaced by Cris, and the members of team Marsha (Grace and Julie) were transferred over to Cris' team.
 In episode 9, Hana and Mint form Team Lukkade returned to the competition. Hana returned to Team Cris and Mint returned to her original team.
 In episode 12, Plengkwan won the campaign individually, automatically advancing into the finale. Lukkade, Bee and Cris were allowed to choose any one contestant to advance into the finale from the remaining seven models. Lukkade chose Fah, Bee chose Sky, and Cris chose Grace. Tia, Tubtim and Mint were eliminated.
 In episode 13, Fah won the campaign individually, however there was no elimination so all contestants were put through to the final runway.

Campaigns

 Episode 1: Naked face group shots, Runway and Self Administered 'Transformations' (Casting)
 Episode 2: Opposite Attraction
 Episode 3: Red Carpet Catwalk With Toyota Camry
 Episode 4: Namu Life SnailWhite Créme Body Wash
 Episode 5: Smoke Bomb Fashion Video
 Episode 6: Rainy Catwalk
 Episode 7: Make New York Angels Happen
 Episode 8: SnailWhite Winter Runway
 Episode 9: Morning After
 Episode 10: Zorb Ball Catwalk
 Episode 11: Heaven Helps You
 Episode 12: Make it happen-MV 
 Episode 13: Acting short film for Samsung Galaxy S8+ and Final walk

Note

References

External links 
Facebook
Twitter
Instagram

Thailand
2017 Thai television seasons
The Face Thailand seasons